Walter Latham (born December 13, 1970) is an American film and comedy producer born and raised in Brooklyn, New York. Latham, who is African-American, founded a comedy production company, Latham Entertainment, which helped launch the careers of noted comedians and comic actors, including Bernie Mac, Steve Harvey, and Mo'Nique. His releases, The Original Kings of Comedy, Queens of Comedy, Latham Entertainment Presents, and Bad Boys of Comedy have grossed more than $200 million worldwide.

Early life
An African-American, Walter Latham was born in Brooklyn, New York, where he was raised in a single-parent home with his mother and younger sister. From childhood, he listened to the comedy albums of Eddie Murphy and Richard Pryor. In search of a better life, he moved to North Carolina in his teens but found life there to be equally as difficult. Guided by his own passion for comedy, Latham dropped out of East Carolina University at age 20 to start a promotion company and produce comedy shows. Walter started the company with a $4000 loan and the support of his mother. His first show failed because the talent he booked failed to show up. Latham did not let this setback deter him. He went on to produce many highly successful comedy tours across the nation.

Career
In December 1997, Walter Latham took a group of black comedians who would in time be known as the Kings of Comedy on tour. Steadfastly believing that packaging a number of popular comedians would be wildly successful, Latham mounted a triple-headliner tour starring Steve Harvey, Cedric The Entertainer, and Bernie Mac. In 1999, the addition of D.L. Hughley and the sponsorship of HBO brought the total grosses over $37 million in two years.

Latham decided to capture the experience of the live Kings of Comedy Tour on film. The Original Kings of Comedy was directed by Spike Lee and produced by Latham Entertainment and MTV films. The film was produced on an estimated $3,000,000 budget. On its opening weekend, Kings of Comedy grossed a total of $11,053,832 on 847 screens, averaging to about $13,051 per venue. The tour grossed over $18 million in its first year. The Original Kings of Comedy eventually grossed a total of $38,168,022 at the box offices.

Filmography

References

External links
 

East Carolina University alumni
African-American male comedians
21st-century American comedians
American male comedians
American male television actors
1970 births
Living people
Businesspeople from Greensboro, North Carolina
21st-century African-American people
20th-century African-American people